Alfred McCoy may refer to:

 Alfred McCoy (American football) (1899–1990), American college sports coach
 Alfred W. McCoy (born 1945), American historian

See also
 Al McCoy (disambiguation)